Shlomo Zalman Halevi Abel (1857–1886) was one of the founders of the Telz Yeshiva and author of Beis Shlomo.

Biography
Abel was born  March 11, (15 Adar) 1857 at Novomyesto-Sugint (now Žemaičių Naumiestis) in the Kovno Governorate of the Russian Empire (present-day Lithuania).

In 1875, together with Meir Atlas and Zvi Yaakov Oppenheim, he assisted in establishing the Telz Yeshiva and subsequently taught there. He was the brother-in-law of Shimon Shkop.

Abel died on Tuesday October 12, (13th Tishrei) 1886.

Works
Beis Shlomo, published posthumously in Vilna in 1893, deals primarily with aspects of Halacha pertaining to financial matters.

References
 Jewish Encyclopedia: ABEL, SOLOMON BEN KALMAN HALEVI

1857 births
1886 deaths
People from Šilutė District Municipality
People from Rossiyensky Uyezd
Lithuanian Haredi rabbis
19th-century rabbis from the Russian Empire
Russian Haredi rabbis